Steve Dimopoulos (born 3 December 1972) is an Australian politician. He has been a Labor Party member of the Victorian Legislative Assembly since 2014 representing the electoral district of  Oakleigh. He has served as the Minister for Tourism, Sport and Major Events and the Minister for Creative Industries in the Second Andrews Ministry since June 2022.

Early career 

Prior to his election to state parliament, Dimopoulos was a councilor, and former mayor of the City of Monash. He previously worked as a public servant in the Department of Justice and the Department of the Premier and Cabinet. He also worked for the former federal member for Hotham, Simon Crean. Before entering politics Dimopoulos was a small business owner in Oakleigh.

Political career 

In 2018 Dimopoulos was appointed Parliamentary Secretary to the Treasurer. He then served as Parliamentary Secretary to the Premier, and Parliamentary Secretary for Mental Health from 2020.

Dimopoulos was sworn in as Minister for Tourism, Sport and Major Events and Minister for Creative Industries on 27 June 2022.

Originally a member of Labor Right, Dimopoulos defected to Labor Left along with six of his colleagues shortly after the 2022 Victorian state election; the defections of his colleagues and himself meant that Labor Left constituted a majority of the state Labor caucus.

Personal life 
Dimopoulos is of Greek descent, and is the first openly gay frontbencher, along with Harriet Shing in the Parliament of Victoria.

References

External links

 Member profile – Parliament of Victoria website

1972 births
Living people
Australian Labor Party members of the Parliament of Victoria
Members of the Victorian Legislative Assembly
Victoria (Australia) local councillors
Mayors of places in Victoria (Australia)
Australian people of Greek descent
21st-century Australian politicians
LGBT legislators in Australia
Labor Left politicians